Google Mobile Services (GMS) is a collection of proprietary applications and application programming interfaces (APIs) services from Google that are typically pre-installed on Android devices, such as smartphones, tablets, and smart TVs. GMS is not a part of the Android Open Source Project (AOSP), which means an Android manufacturer needs to obtain a license from Google in order to legally pre-install GMS on an Android device. This license is provided by Google without any licensing fees except in the EU.

Core applications 

 Google Search
 Google Chrome
 YouTube
 Google Play
 Google Drive
 Gmail
 Google Meet
 Google Maps
 Google Photos
 Google TV
 YouTube Music

Historically 

 Google+
 Google Hangouts
 Google Wallet
 Google Messenger
 Google Play Books
 Google Play Magazines
 Google Play Music
 Google Play Movies & TV
 Google Play Games
 Google Duo

Reception, competitors, and regulators

FairSearch 

Numerous European firms filed a complaint to the European Commission stating that Google had manipulated their power and dominance within the market to push their Services to be used by phone manufacturers. The firms were joined together under the name FairSearch, and the main firms included were Microsoft, Expedia, TripAdvisor, Nokia and Oracle. FairSearch's major problem with Google's practices was that they believed Google were forcing phone manufacturers to use their Mobile Services. They claimed Google managed this by asking these manufacturers to sign a contract stating that they must preinstall specific Google Mobile Services, such as Maps, Search and YouTube, in order to get the latest version of Android. Google swiftly responded stating that they "continue to work co-operatively with the European Commission".

Aptoide 

The third-party Android app store Aptoide also filed an EU competition complaint against Google once again stating that they are misusing their power within the market. Aptoide alleged that Google was blocking third-party app stores from being on Google Play, as well as blocking Google Chrome from downloading any third-party apps and app stores. As of June 2014, Google had not responded to these allegations.

Abuse of Android Dominance 

In May 2019, Umar Javeed, Sukarma Thapar, Aaqib Javeed vs. Google LLC & Ors. the Competition Commission of India ordered an antitrust probe against Google for abusing its dominant position with Android to block market rivals. In Prima Facie opinion the commission held, Mandatory Pre-installation of entire Google Mobile Services (GMS) suite under Mobile application distribution agreements MADA amounts to imposition of unfair condition on the device manufacturers.

EU Antitrust Ruling 
On July 18, 2018, the European Commission fined Google €4.34 billion for breaching EU antitrust rules which resulted in a change of licensing policy for the GMS in the EU. A new paid licensing agreement for smartphones and tablets shipped into the EEA was created.  
The change is that the GMS is now decoupled from the base Android and will be offered under a separate paid licensing agreement.

Privacy policy 

At the same time, Google faced problems with various European data protection agencies, most notably In the United Kingdom and France. The problem they faced was that they had a set of 60 rules merged into one, which allowed Google to "track users more closely". Google once again came out and stated that their new policies still abide by European Union laws.

See also 
 List of Android apps by Google
 Google Play Services
 Microsoft mobile services
 Huawei Mobile Services

References

External links 
 

Android (operating system)
Application software
mobile services
Mobile software